The 2nd constituency of Yvelines is a French legislative constituency in the Yvelines département.

Description

The 2nd constituency of Yvelines includes part of Versailles as well as the areas to its immediate south and west.

Like much of eastern Yvelines, the seat is dominated by the wealthy suburbs to the west of Paris. The seat was staunchly conservative, having voted for the Republicans, Union for a Popular Movement, and its predecessor Rally for the Republic at every election since 1988 prior to 2017. Its deputy from 2002 to 2016, Valérie Pécresse, served as a minister during the premiership of François Fillon.

Historic representation

Election results

2022 by-election
The 2022 election was threatened by annulment due to Anne Grignon being both substitute for a deputy and substitute for a senator (Martin Lévrier, in violation  of the electoral code. In order to avoid the cancellation of the election, Anne Grignon resigned from her mandate as deputy on August 12th, 2022.

On July 4th, 2022, Jean-Noël Barrot was appointed Deputy Minister in charge of the Digital Transition and Telecommunications. Consequently, he should have been replaced in the National Assembly on August 3rd, 2022 by his resigning substitute Anne Grignon for the duration of the exercise of his governmental functions. Due to her resignation, a by-election was called.

A by-election was therefore called for October 2nd, 2022 to fill the vacant seat in this constituency. The second round of voting took place on October 9th, 2022. Due to Jean-Noël Barrot being a minister in office, he was replaced in the National Assembly for the duration of these functions by his deputy, Anne Bergantz.
 
 
 
 
 
 

 
 
 
 
 

* Renaissance dissident

2022

 
 
 
 
 
 
 
|-
| colspan="8" bgcolor="#E9E9E9"|
|-

2017

 
 
 
 
 
 
 
|-
| colspan="8" bgcolor="#E9E9E9"|
|-

2016 by-election

 
 
 
 
 
|-
| colspan="8" bgcolor="#E9E9E9"|
|-

2012

 
 
 
 
 
 
|-
| colspan="8" bgcolor="#E9E9E9"|
|-

2007

 
 
 
 
 
 
|-
| colspan="8" bgcolor="#E9E9E9"|
|-

2002

 
 
 
 
 
 
 
|-
| colspan="8" bgcolor="#E9E9E9"|
|-

1997

 
 
 
 
 
 
 
 
|-
| colspan="8" bgcolor="#E9E9E9"|
|-

Sources

Official results of French elections from 2002: "Résultats électoraux officiels en France" (in French).

2